Livno Airport is an airport situated in the municipality of Livno in Bosnia and Herzegovina, at the south-east side of Livanjsko field, about 10 kilometers away from the town of Livno. It is a small airport for aircraft up to 5700 kg Maximum Takeoff Weight. It has four grass runways which are 850, 750, 1100 and 600 meters in length. It served as a Partisan airport during World War II.

References

External links
 Aeroklub Livno

Livno
Airports in Bosnia and Herzegovina
Livanjsko polje